The Gauja Valley  (Latvian Gaujas leja) is a painting by Latvian painter  from 1891.

Description
Gaujas leja is one of the best known of the artist's works; the painting became one of the symbols of Latvian landscape. It is an oil painting on canvas and measures 101 x 173 cm.

It is located in the Latvian National Museum of Art.

Provenance
The painting was first exhibited at the Art Academy exhibition in St. Petersburg. After twenty years it was owned by a private collector. In 1921, the Riga City Art Museum purchased it.

References 

1891 paintings
Latvian paintings
Landscape paintings